The 2019 Atlantic 10 Conference men's soccer season was the 33rd season of men's college soccer in the Atlantic 10 Conference. The season began on August 30, 2019 and concluded on November 2, 2019.

The regular season and tournament was won by Rhode Island. Rhode Island bested VCU for the regular season championship and Dayton for the tournament championship. Rhode Island earned the Atlantic 10's automatic, and only, berth into the 2019 NCAA Division I Men's Soccer Tournament, where they lost in the opening round to Syracuse.

Dayton's Jonas Fjeldberg won the Atlantic 10 Offensive Player of the Year, while Joergen Oland won the Atlantic 10 Defensive Player of the Year Award. Gareth Elliott won the Atlantic 10 Coach of the Year Award.

Background

Previous season 

UMass entered the season as the defending regular season and tournament champions. The Minutemen finished eighth in the regular season and were eliminated in the quarterfinals of the A-10 Tournament by VCU. VCU won the regular season championship, giving the Rams their first A-10 regular season title, and their first regular season championship overall since 2004. Rhode Island won the tournament, given them their first A-10 tournament title since 2006.

Rhode Island at the A-10 Tournament champions, earned the conference's automatic berth into the NCAA Tournament. They were the only berth the A-10 sent to the NCAA Tournament. There they were defeated by their rivals, Connecticut, 3–4.

Coaching changes 
Fordham head coach, Jim McElderry, resigned at the end of the 2018 season to accept the head coaching job at Rutgers University. On January 30, 2019 Fordham hired Carlo Acquista as the program's head coach.

Head coaches

Preseason

Preseason poll 
The preseason poll was releasedon August 22, 2019.

Preseason national polls 
The preseason national polls will be released in July and August 2019.

Regular season

Early season tournaments 

Five teams participated in early season soccer tournaments hosted either by themselves or other nearby universities.

Positions by round

Postseason

Atlantic 10 Tournament 

The 2019 A-10 Tournament was held from November 9 to November 17. Fordham University hosted the tournament from the semifinals onwards. Rhode Island defended their A10 Tournament title and earned the conference's automatic berth into the NCAA Tournament.

NCAA Tournament 

The NCAA Tournament began on November 17, 2019 and concluded on December 15, 2019.

Rankings

National rankings

Regional rankings - USC Southeast

Awards and honors

Player of the week honors

Postseason honors

Regional awards

National awards

2020 MLS Draft

The 2020 MLS SuperDraft was held on January 9, 2020. Three players from the conference were drafted.

Total picks by school

List of selections

Homegrown players 

The Homegrown Player Rule is a Major League Soccer program that allows MLS teams to sign local players from their own development academies directly to MLS first team rosters. Before the creation of the rule in 2008, every player entering Major League Soccer had to be assigned through one of the existing MLS player allocation processes, such as the MLS SuperDraft.

To place a player on its homegrown player list, making him eligible to sign as a homegrown player, players must have resided in that club's home territory and participated in the club's youth development system for at least one year. Players can play college soccer and still be eligible to sign a homegrown contract.

No players from the Atlantic 10 Conference signed homegrown contracts.

References

External links 
 Atlantic 10 Men's Soccer

 
2019 NCAA Division I men's soccer season